East Barming  is a village in the civil parish of Barming in the Maidstone District of Kent, England. The village is located on the A26 road out of Maidstone, three miles (4.8 km) from the town centre, and is virtually part of its built-up area.

In the Domesday Book there are two villages mentioned: West Barming and East Barming. The former had a parish church, closed in the 16th century. Its ecclesiastic parish is now part of Nettlestead parish. The parish church of East Barming is dedicated to St Margaret, and is of Norman origin.

Hall Place, one of the many residences of the Culpeper family, lies to the north of the village.

See also
Barming
Barming Heath

External links

Hall Place and East Barming

Villages in Kent
Civil parishes in Kent